Lombardic capitals is the name given to a type of decorative upper-case letters used in inscriptions and, typically, at the start of a section of text in medieval manuscripts. They are characterized by their rounded forms with thick, curved stems. Paul Shaw describes the style as a "relative" of uncial writing. 

Unlike Gothic capitals, Lombardic capitals were also used to write words or entire phrases. They were used both in illuminated manuscripts and monumental inscriptions, like the bell tower of Santa Chiara, Naples. In Italian, the style is known as "Longobarda" after an earlier spelling of the Lombardy region.

History 
The term Lombardic comes from the study of incunabula. A characteristic form of text decoration in manuscripts and early printed books with hand colouring was to use alternating red and blue Lombardic capitals for the start of each successive paragraph.
Unlike historiated or inhabited initials, Lombardic capitals are devoid of further decoration.

In modern times, fonts of Lombardic capitals have been designed by many typographers, such as Frederic Goudy, who included a set as an alternative uppercase for his Goudy Text font.

See also
Historiated initial
Inhabited initial

References

External links
 Lombardic Lettering at Chartres 
 14th Century ring engraved with Lombardic capitals (Victoria and Albert Museum)

Carolingian art
Palaeographic letters
Latin-script calligraphy
Medieval scripts
Western calligraphy